Edward Moore Gaines (born April 25, 1958) is an American politician and businessman serving as a member of the California Board of Equalization for the 1st district. He previously served as a California State Senator, representing the 1st Senate district from 2011 to 2019.

Career 
Gaines is the owner of Gaines Insurance located in Roseville, California.

In 1997, Gaines was appointed to the Roseville Planning Commission, where he served for two years. In 2000, he was elected to the Placer County Board of Supervisors. He was reelected to a second term in 2004.

Gaines was elected to the California State Senate in a January 4, 2011 special election to replace the late Dave Cox and took office two days later. Prior to his election to the Senate, Gaines was a California State Assemblyman, who represented the 4th district, which includes the Placer County suburbs east of Sacramento. Gaines succeeded longtime local politician Tim Leslie in the Assembly.

2008 congressional election 
Gaines formed an exploratory committee in fall of 2007 to run against longtime Congressman John Doolittle. However, before Doolittle announced he was retiring, Gaines announced he had decided to instead run for a second term in the State Assembly, for which he had neither a primary nor general election opponent.

2014 insurance commissioner election

Gaines ran for California Insurance commissioner in 2014 against Democratic incumbent Dave Jones. They both advanced to the general election, which Jones won by 4,038,165 votes (57.5%) to 2,981,951 (42.5%).

2018 Board of Equalization election
Gaines ran for district 1 of the California Board of Equalization in November 2018 and narrowly won with 51% of the votes.

2021 gubernatorial recall election

Gaines was a Republican candidate for Governor of California in the 2021 California gubernatorial recall election. The 50% threshold to recall incumbent Democrat Gavin Newsom was not reached. Gaines received 0.7% of the replacement candidate vote.

Personal life 
Gaines and his wife, Beth Gaines, who has also served in politics, currently live in El Dorado Hills with their six children.

References

External links 
 
 Campaign website
 Join California Ted Gaines

1958 births
21st-century American politicians
Businesspeople in insurance
Republican Party California state senators
Candidates in the 2021 United States elections
Lewis & Clark College alumni
Living people
Republican Party members of the California State Assembly
People from El Dorado Hills, California
People from Roseville, California
Spouses of California politicians